Razdolnoye is a rural locality (a selo) and the administrative center of Sovkhozskoye Rural Settlement, Nikolayevsky District, Volgograd Oblast, Russia. The population was 1,451 as of 2010. There are 18 streets.

Geography 
Razdolnoye is located in steppe of the Transvolga, 59 km southeast of Nikolayevsk (the district's administrative centre) by road. Kumysolechebnitsa is the nearest rural locality.

References 

Rural localities in Nikolayevsky District, Volgograd Oblast